This is a list of Indonesian national songs with the creators based on the alphabet.

A - D 

 Andika Bhayangkari (Amir Pasaribu)
 Api Kemerdekaan (Joko Lelono / Marlene)
 Bagimu Negeri (R. Kusbini)
 Bangun Pemudi-Pemuda (Alfred Simanjuntak)
 Bendera Kita (Dirman Sasmokoadi)
 Bungaku (Cornel Simanjuntak)
 Bendera Merah Putih (Ibu Soed)
 Berkibarlah Benderaku (Ibu Soed)
 Bhinneka Tunggal Ika (Binsar Sitompul/A. Thalib)
 Dari Sabang Sampai Merauke (R. Soerardjo)
 Di Timur Matahari (Wage Rudolf Soepratman)
 Dirgahayu Indonesia (Husein Mutahar)
 Desaku (Liberty Manik)
 Berkibarlah Bendera Negriku (Gombloh)
 Tanah Air Indonesia (E.L. Pohan)

E - H 

 Gugur Bunga (Ismail Marzuki)
 Halo, Halo Bandung (Ismail Marzuki)
 Hamba Menyanyi (R. Sutedjo)
 Hari Merdeka (Husein Mutahar)
 Himne Kemerdekaan (Ibu Soed/Wiratmo Sukito)
 Himne Guru (Sartono)
 Himne Pramuka (Husein Mutahar)
 Himne Siswa (Husein Mutahar)

I - L 

 Ibu Kita Kartini (Wage Rudolf Soepratman)
 Ibu Pertiwi (song) (Kamsidi Samsuddin and/or Ismail Marzuki)
 Indonesia Bersatulah (Alfred Simanjuntak)
 Indonesia Jaya (Chaken M)
 Indonesia Raya (Wage Rudolf Soepratman)
 Indonesia Subur (M Syafei)
 Indonesia Pusaka (Ismail Marzuki)
 Indonesia Tetap Merdeka (Cornel Simanjuntak)
 Indonesia Tumpah Darahku (Ibu Soed)
 Jembatan Merah (Gesang)
 Karangan Bunga dari Selatan (Ismail Marzuki)
 Kebyar Kebyar (Gombloh)
 Ku Pinta Lagi (Cornel Simanjuntak)

M - P 

 Maju Indonesia (Cornel Simanjuntak)
 Maju Tak Gentar (Cornel Simanjuntak)
 Mars Bambu Runcing (Kamsidi/Daldjono)
 Mars Harapan Bangsa (Kamsidi/Daldjono)
 Mars Pancasila (Sudharnoto)
 Melati di Tapal Batas (Ismail Marzuki)
 Mengheningkan Cipta (Hymne Pahlawan) (Truno Prawit)
 Merah Putih (Ibu Soed)
 Merah Putih (Gombloh)
 Nusantara
 Nyiur Hijau (Maladi)
 Pada Pahlawan (Cornel Simanjuntak/Usmar Ismail)
 Padi Menguning (Kusbini)
 Pahlawan Merdeka (Wage Rudolf Soepratman)
 Pantang Mundur (Titiek Puspa)

Q - T 

 Rayuan Pulau Kelapa (Ismail Marzuki)
 Satu Nusa Satu Bangsa (Liberty Manik)
 Selamat Datang Pahlawan Muda (Ismail Marzuki)
 Sepasang Mata Bola (Ismail Marzuki)
 Serumpun Padi (Maladi)
 Sumpah Kita (A.E. Wairata)
 Syukur (Husein Mutahar)
 Tanah Airku (Ibu Soed)
 Tanah Airku (R. Iskak)
 Tanah Tumpah Darahku (Cornel Simanjuntak/Sanusi Pane)
 Teguh Kukuh Berlapis Baja (Cornel Simanjuntak/Usmar Ismail)
 Terima Kasih Kepada Pahlawanku (Husein Mutahar)

See also 

 List of national anthems
 List of regional songs of Indonesia

References

External links 

  Organisasi.org - Lirik Lagu Wajib Indonesia

Indonesian songs
Indonesian patriotic songs
Songs